Anna Carlgren (pronounced ['ana 'ka:lgre:n]), born July 1960, in Växjö, Sweden, is a glass artist.

Education 
In 1977-78, she studied painting and Chinese calligraphy under Han Bong Duk in Stockholm. From 1978-1980, she studied at Orrefors Glass School. She also worked at Kosta Boda (1979), built a studio together with D. Valkema (1980), and was artist-in-residence at Pilchuk Glass School (Stanwood, Washington) where she also has lectured. She graduated from the Gerrit Rietveld Academy in Amsterdam in 1983.

Career

Anna Carlgren's first solo exhibition was presented in the glass museum in Växjö, Sweden. Her main focus is transparency and optical phenomena in glass. She writes and lectures on this subject whilst exhibiting her work in museums and galleries all over the world. Her work is included in Jaroslava Brychtova's private collection; the Harvey Littleton Collection; and the collections of Ulla Forsell and Annelies van der Vorm, among others.

Designer Rörstrand, currently part of the Fiskars Group; Royal Leerdam Crystal; Waterset featured in I.D. Magazine New York.

In 2002, Carlgren, Durk Valkema, and Annelies van der Vorm decided to create the Vrij Glas Foundation in Zaandam, NL. While an artist-in-residence in Paris 2003-04, Anna Carlgren consulted for IASPIS International Artists’ Studio Program in Sweden and worked on plans for the foundation.

She is one of the founders of the Glasakademin in Sweden, where she has been its acting President for six years and is currently head of the Glasakademin's Commission for Knowledge Transfer.

References

External links
Official website

Living people
Swedish artists
Glass artists
Women glass artists
Swedish writers
1960 births